Nozarashi Kikō, variously translated as The Records of a Weather-Exposed Skeleton or Travelogue of Weather-Beaten Bones, is the first travel journal haibun by the Japanese poet Matsuo Bashō. Written in the summer of 1684, the work covers Bashō's journey. According to translator Nobuyuki Yuasa, it is "the first work of Bashō where we find glimpses of his mature style."

Background
In the summer of 1683 (one year before the journey), Bashō's mother passed away. In the following winter, Bashō's friends and disciples built a home for him in Fukagawa. On the occasion, Bashō wrote:

Summary
In autumn of the first year of Jōkyō, Bashō departed from his home. Passing Mount Fuji and walking along the Fuji River, 
Bashō finds an abandoned infant, tossing some food to the child before moving on. Further stops include the Ise Grand Shrine and Bashō's hometown, where he meets with relatives and mourns the loss of his mother. Next, he visits Yamato Province, Mount Futagami in the Ryōhaku Mountains, and the remains of Saigyo's hut. As the text progresses, the journaling prose is replaced by a series of poems.

English translations

References

Edo-period works
Japanese poetry collections
Travel books
Articles containing Japanese poems
Haiku